Tesakoviaspis concentrica is an extinct species of primitive jawless fish from the Middle Ordovician.

References

Ordovician jawless fish
Pteraspidomorphi genera
Middle Ordovician animals